Thomas Dawson Bell (3 December 1884 – 6 March 1951) was an English professional footballer who played as an inside forward.

References

1884 births
1951 deaths
People from South Moor
Footballers from County Durham
English footballers
Association football inside forwards
West Stanley F.C. players
Grimsby Town F.C. players
Scunthorpe United F.C. players
Cleethorpes Town F.C. players
English Football League players